Seventh Day Adventist Grammar School, ILE-IFE, is a secondary school in Ile-Ife.

Mission president Joseph Adeyemo Adeogun, who was the first indigenous minister to assume the mantle of leadership, was instrumental in the founding of the secondary school, the Adventist Grammar School in Ede in 1960.

References 

Secondary schools in Osun State
Educational institutions established in 1960
1960 establishments in Nigeria